Simon Fenton (born 10 June 1976) is an English actor who has appeared in several different television roles.

One of his earliest roles was in Tom's Midnight Garden, and he also appeared in the ITV children's series T-Bag and the Sunstones of Montezuma, Through The Dragon's Eye, and the Russell T Davies series Century Falls. He appeared in the movie The Power of One as the 12-year-old protagonist P.K., a role for which he was nominated for a Young Artist Awards in the category "Best Young Actor Co-starring in a Motion Picture".  In 1993, he appeared with John Goodman in the quirky American comedy Matinee, in a role playing an American boy, and in 1994 he played Luke in the Channel 4 miniseries The Rector's Wife. More recently, he was in Band of Brothers and The Bill.

References

External links

1976 births
English male film actors
English male television actors
Living people